The smooth knob-tailed gecko is a type of gecko and may refer to:
 Nephrurus laevissimus
 Nephrurus levis